The 2021 European Rowing Championships were held from 9 to 11 April 2021 in Varese, Italy. 18 events in rowing and 4 in para rowing.

Medal summary

Men

Women

Mixed para-rowing events

Medal table

References

European Rowing Championships
2021
Rowing competitions in Italy
European Rowing Championships
European Rowing Championships
Sport in Varese